Ion Scurtu (–July 23, 1922) was an Austro-Hungarian-born Romanian literary critic.

A native of Brașov, in the Transylvania region, he attended the local Romanian high school, where his father was a teacher. He then entered Budapest University, but withdrew in order to work as an editor for the Sibiu-based Tribuna. From there, he crossed into the Romanian Old Kingdom and edited Nicolae Fleva's Dreptatea. Returning to Transylvania, he enrolled in Franz Joseph University at Cluj, but was expelled for his nationalist activism. He was obliged to return to the Old Kingdom, and from there made his way to Leipzig University. He earned a doctorate there in 1903; his dissertation dealt with Mihai Eminescu's life and prose work. He continued to devote himself to the study of Eminescu, writing his biography and editing collections of his writings. During the first decade of the 20th century, he was an editor at Sămănătorul.

Notes

1877 births
1922 deaths
People from Brașov
Andrei Șaguna National College (Brașov) alumni
Romanian Austro-Hungarians
Austro-Hungarian emigrants to Romania
Leipzig University alumni
Romanian literary critics
Romanian literary historians
Romanian biographers
Romanian male writers
Male biographers
Romanian newspaper editors
Romanian magazine editors